František Čermák and Filip Polášek were the defending champions but Polášek decided not to participate.
Čermák plays alongside Michal Mertiňák and won the title, defeating Simone Bolelli and Daniele Bracciali 7–5, 6–3 in the final.

Seeds

Draw

Draw

References
 Main Draw

Kremlin Cup - Doubles
2012 Men's Doubles